Bartolomeo Goggio (also known Goggi, Gogio, and Gogo) was an Italian author and notary. He was born in Ferrara circa 1430 and died sometime after 1493. He is most recognized for De laudibus mulierum [On the Merits of Women], written in the late 1480s, which was dedicated to Eleanor of Naples, Duchess of Ferrara. Only one surviving manuscript of De laudibus mulierum, currently held at the British Library, is known to exist. For this work, Goggio is recognized as a contributor to the pro-woman side of the querelle des femmes — "a debate about the nature and worth of women that unfolded in Europe from the medieval to the early modern period." In De laudibus mulierum Goggio argues the superiority of women. After Eleanor's death, Goggio wrote another philosophical work, De nobilitate humani animi opus.

References 

1430 births
Year of birth uncertain
Year of death unknown
15th-century Italian writers
Italian male writers
Italian notaries